En cavale is the first extended play by French singer Pomme, released on January 1, 2016 through Polydor Records. The album was produced by Yann Arnaud. En cavale follows the release of her first single "J'suis pas dupe" on June 29, 2015, including that track in the album.

Track listing

Personnel 
Credits adapted from En cavale liner notes.

Musicians

 Pomme – lead vocals, cello (track 1), backing vocals (track 1, 2)
Olivier Marguerit – bass, piano (track 1, 3, 4), synthesizer (track 1, 3), organ (track 2, 4), backing vocals (track 2), trumpet (track 3)
Sammy Decoster – guitar, banjo (track 1, 4), backing vocals (track 2)
Jean Thevenin – drums, percussion
Jan Ghazi – guitar (track 4)
Victor Roux – compositor (track 1, 4)

Design

Frank Loriou – design
Lucie Sassiat – photography

Production

 Yann Arnaud – production, mixing (track 3), recording
Jean-Dominique Grossard – additional recording
 Antoine Chabert – mastering, engineering

Recording

 Recorded at La Frette Studios, Melodium Studio and Studio Polydor
 Mixed at La Frette Studios and Melodium Studio
 Mastered at Translab
 Produced at La Frette Studios and Melodium Studio

References

2016 debut EPs
Pomme (singer) albums